The Groșeni or Valea Groșilor is a right tributary of the river Teuz in Romania. It flows into the Teuz south of Beliu.

References

Rivers of Romania
Rivers of Arad County